Eltham is a suburb of Melbourne, Victoria, Australia, 20 km north-east of the Central Business District, located within the Shire of Nillumbik local government area. Eltham recorded a population of 18,847 at the 2021 census.

Eltham is one of the 'green wedge' areas that provide relatively undeveloped, accessible environments within the Melbourne suburban region. These green wedge areas are under constant pressure from developments such as road and freeway expansions, but Eltham has managed to retain many tree-lined streets and leafy reserves. However, the character of the suburb is changing rapidly, with increased road traffic and higher-density housing becoming more common.

Eltham's tourist attractions include the artists colony Montsalvat and the Diamond Valley Railway, the largest ridable miniature railway in Australia.

History
A reserve for a village at the junction of the Diamond Creek and Yarra River is shown on maps around 1848. By 1851 the first Crown allotments were being subdivided and sold, along with a private subdivision developed by J. M. Holloway, known as Little Eltham. At this time, the town's centre was located around the intersection of Pitt Street and Main Road. An early settler was Henry Dendy who operated a flour mill.

Eltham Post Office opened on 1 February 1854.

The first Eltham Cemetery Trust was appointed in February 1860. The Eltham Court House was built in 1860 and is listed on the Victorian Heritage Database. The Eltham Magistrates' Court closed on 1 February 1985.

St Margaret's Church commenced construction in 1861 at 10 John St Eltham.

The Evelyn Observer was a weekly newspaper published from 1873 to 1942. It had various titles over the years.  Digitsed copies can be accessed for various dates via Trove. Other local newspapers have included Eltham and Whittlesea Shires Advertiser and Diamond Creek Valley Advocate (1917-1922) and Eltham and Whittlesea Shire Advertiser (1940-1942) These papers can also be accessed via Trove.

The Eltham Hotel was established in 1867 and continues to be in business.

The arrival of the railway line in 1902 drew business further north along Main Road to the current town centre.

A war memorial in the form of an obelisk of granite was unveiled 3 August 1919 in what was then the centre of the township. In the 1960s it was relocated to the front of the Eltham RSL sub branch. It was moved again in 2010 in front of the Eltham War Memorial Building Complex.  The Eltham War Memorial Building Complex recognises those who served and died in World War 2. The community complex originally featured an infant welfare centre, war memorial gates and a wrought iron arch, memorial garden, pre-school and children's library.

Eltham Presbyterian Church opened in 1958.

The Eltham Refugee Housing and Support Project was delivered in partnership with St Vincent's Health Australia and CatholicCare to provide accommodation and settlement support to newly arrived refugees from Syria and Iraq. From November 2016 to October 2018, refugees were provided with affordable accommodation in refurbished units on the site of St Vincent's Care Services Eltham Aged Care facility. During this time, CatholicCare provided tenancy and settlement support.

Leader Community Newspapers published the Diamond Valley Leader which included Eltham in its reporting area for some years before it ceased publication in June 2020.

The historic courthouse, the oldest building in the Shire of Nillumbik was restored by Ducon Building Solutions and RBA Architects and Conservation Consultants and completed by March 2022

Appeal to artists

Eltham is famous for the Montsalvat artist community, which built a rustic set of medieval-style buildings in the 1930s.

Aside from the Montsalvat artist community, Eltham has also been home to artists such as Walter Withers and Neil Douglas, as well as to writers such as Alan Marshall and Mervyn Skipper.

Education
Primary schools include Eltham Primary School which was established in Little Eltham in July 1855, Our Lady Help of Christians Primary, Eltham East Primary and Eltham North Primary School.

Eltham encompasses the state secondary school, Eltham High School, as well as a private girls secondary school, Catholic Ladies College, Eltham. Another private secondary school, Eltham College of Education, takes its name from Eltham, but is located in nearby Research. There are various childcare and early learning centres available. Several schools are also located in the exclusive connecting area of Eltham North, including St. Helena Secondary College, Plenty Valley International Montessori School, Holy Trinity Primary School, Glen Katherine Primary School and near Eltham College there is Research Primary.

Transport
Eltham railway station is located on the Hurstbridge Line.

Eltham is a key connection point of bus services across the northern and eastern suburbs of Melbourne, including the Route 902 orbital service.  Eltham Railway Station services as a local hub for buses to locations including Warrandyte, Diamond Creek, Greensborough, Doncaster and local services.

Sport
World champions Emma Carney (triathlete) and Cadel Evans (racing cyclist) are both Eltham residents.

The suburb is home to the Eltham Wildcats Basketball Club which is the largest basketball club in Australia, Eltham Redbacks Football Club and Eltham Cricket Club.

Eltham Old Collegians Football Club compete in the VAFA.

Eltham Football Club, known as the Panthers is an Australian Rules Club competing in the Northern Football League.
Eltham Rugby Union Football Club is centrally located in Bridge St with teams for all groups including Masters.
 
The suburb is home to the Eltham Tennis Club, Eltham Netball Club and Eltham Bowling Club (which has both grass and synthetic greens), and Eltham Lacrosse Club.

Eltham Little Athletics Club is one of the largest of the eight clubs competing weekly at the Diamond Valley Little Athletics Centre at Willinda Park, Greensborough.

Historic trestle bridge
Eltham is home to a historic wooden railway trestle bridge. The bridge was built in 1902 and is the only wooden trestle bridge still in use in Melbourne's electric railway network. It is also one of few wooden trestle bridges in use in Victoria. It was built as part of the extension of the Hurstbridge Railway line from Heidelberg to Hurstbridge which opened in 1912.

Facilities

The Diamond Creek trail passes through Eltham.

Eltham Cemetery

Eltham Farmers' Market

Eltham Library is operated by Yarra Plenty Regional Library.

Eltham Leisure Centre features the Platinum Pool Program which meets the gold standard by Life Saving Victoria.

The Senior Citizen's Centre was completed in 1967.

Parks 

Alistair Knox Park() is named after Alistair Knox, a famous local landscape architect who specialised in mud brick.  The park is located on Main Road near the central Eltham shopping strip. The Eltham Library is located nearby. The kids playground is found within the open and lightly wooded forest. Facilities include an old wooden playground, toilets, barbecues, a duck pond, and a sculpture.

Alan Marshall Reserve is located on the corner of Main Road and Leane Drive. It was named for the author who lived part of his life locally. The park has been there since at least 2007.

Barak Bushlands are at the location previously known as Falkiner Street Reserve, located to the west of Wingrove Park along the Diamond Creek. They were named for Indigenous leader William Barak by Nillumbik Shire Council in 2004.

Laughing Waters park is a bushland named after the sound of the kookaburras, and the water running over the rocks in the nearby waterhole, which is a busy spot for tourists. It was a popular spot for the artists of Montsalvat to live and paint. Closer to the Yarra River, it is riparian forest, inland it is damp dry open forest.

Community groups 
 1st Eltham Scouts
 2nd Eltham Sea Scouts
 Eltham Child Care Cooperative
 Eltham Community Action Group are active in the community and work to maintain Eltham's character.
 Eltham District Historical Society collects, preserves and share stories about the local history of the Eltham district.
 Eltham Toy Library provides an environment for children to learn, grow and play.
Rotary Club of Eltham
 Welcome to Eltham supports refugees and people seeking asylum settling in Eltham.

Notable residents
Peter Bassett-Smith - Cameraman
Clem Christesen - Literary Editor
Nina Christesen - Russian Academic
Peter Hitchener- news reader 
 Kerry Armstrong - actor
 Emily Browning - actor
 Tim Burstall - film director
Emma Carney - Multiple World Champion Triathlete, Sport Australia Hall of Fame Member, World Triathlon Hall of Fame, Triathlon Australia Hall of Fame.  Athletics Australia Member #700.
 Cadel Evans - cyclist
 Peter Helliar - comedian
 Phil Judd - musician and artist. Founder of Split Enz and The Swingers. Wrote the No. 1 hit "Counting The Beat"
 Alistair Knox - house builder and landscape architect
Percy Leason - Political cartoonist and artist
Greg Macainsh - musician and songwriter
 Alan Marshall - author
 Ben Mendelsohn - actor
Peter Moore - Australian Rules Footballer
 Adam Simpson - former captain of the Kangaroos Australian rules football club
Donald Thomson - anthropologist
 Terry Wallace - former AFL coach, Richmond Football Club 
 Merrick Watts - comedian
 Wilbur Wilde - musician, television personality
 Daniel Young aka Muph - Rap lyricist from the Puah Hedz and Muph & Plutonic (Aria nominated 2008 album "And Then Tomorrow Came"). Released 8 albums from 1999 to 2019. Every release mentioned "Eltham" in the lyrics and it even had the 2003 song "A Tribute To Eltham".

See also
 Shire of Diamond Valley – Parts of Eltham were previously within this former local government area.
 Shire of Eltham – Parts of Eltham were previously within this former local government area.
 Eltham copper, a subspecies of butterfly particular to, and named after Eltham

References

External links

 Eltham - eMelbourne the city past and present
 Eltham Town
 Victorian Places - Eltham and Etham Shire

Suburbs of Melbourne
Suburbs of the Shire of Nillumbik